Dwarakapet is a village panchayat in Chityala mandal in Jayashankar Bhupalpally district in the state of Telangana in India.

Geography

Location in Google Maps

Approximate co-ordinates: 18o 25' 39.94", 79o 36' 21.14"

References 

Villages in Jayashankar Bhupalpally district